Adma and ADMA may refer to:

Places

Lebanon
Adma wa Dafneh, a town on Mount Lebanon

United States
Adma, West Virginia, an unincorporated community in Barbour County

Other uses
Adma (motorcycle)
Asymmetric dimethylarginine (ADMA)
Association for Data-driven Marketing and Advertising (ADMA), which absorbed Australian Interactive Media Industry Association (AIMIA)